Edward [Ēadweard, Eadward, Édouard, Étbard] was a 12th-century prelate based in Scotland. He occurs in the records for the first time as Bishop of Aberdeen in a document datable to some point between 1147 and 1151. His immediate predecessor, as far as the records are concerned, was Bishop Nechtán. The latter can be shown to have been active at least between 1131 and 1132, and possibly as late as 1137. Edward's accession must have occurred, then, sometime between 1131 and 1151, with a date after the 1130s more likely than not.

Edward witnessed charters of Kings David I, Máel Coluim IV and William the Lion. Bishop Edward was the recipient of a Bull, dated 10 August 1157, of Pope Adrian IV, confirming the possessions of the diocese of Aberdeen and authorising the bishop to appoint at his own discretion either monastic or secular canons to staff his cathedral. This to some extent marks Bishop Edward as a founding father figure for the bishopric, though he was not the first bishop. His name, Edward, may indicate an Anglo-Norman or even an Anglo-Saxon origin, though this cannot be taken with certainty, as the name was associated with the saintly and famous Normanised English King Edward the Confessor, and had been the name of a son of King Máel Coluim III mac Donnchada. Nevertheless, if the former is the case, he is the first non-native Scot to ascend the bishopric of Aberdeen.

It is possible, if not likely, that Edward was the Chancellor of that name who served King David I in the 1140s. Edward's death, recorded in the Chronicle of Melrose, occurred in 1171. He was succeeded by Matthew.

References
 Dowden, John, The Bishops of Scotland, ed. J. Maitland Thomson, (Glasgow, 1912), pp. 98–9
 Innes, Cosmo, Registrum Episcopatus Aberdonensis: Ecclesie Cathedralis Aberdonensis Regesta Que Extant in Unum Collecta, Vol. 1, (Edinburgh, 1845), pp. xix-xx
 Keith, Robert, An Historical Catalogue of the Scottish Bishops: Down to the Year 1688, (London, 1924), p. 104
 Lawrie, Sir Archibald, Early Scottish Charters Prior to A.D. 1153, (Glasgow, 1905)
 Watt, D.E.R., Fasti Ecclesiae Scotinanae Medii Aevi ad annum 1638, 2nd Draft, (St Andrews, 1969), p. 1

1171 deaths
Bishops of Aberdeen
Scoto-Normans
12th-century Scottish Roman Catholic bishops
Lord chancellors of Scotland
Year of birth unknown